Spastonyx is a genus of blister beetles in the family Meloidae. There are at least two described species in Spastonyx.

Species
These two species belong to the genus Spastonyx:
 Spastonyx macswaini (Selander, 1954)
 Spastonyx nemognathoides (Horn, 1870)

References

Further reading

 
 

Meloidae
Articles created by Qbugbot